Mighty Muggs are a vinyl–plastic collectible toy series made by Hasbro. The toys resemble super deformed versions of characters from the following franchises: Star Wars, Marvel Comics, Indiana Jones, G.I. Joe, and Transformers. There is a line of smaller figures, called Mini Muggs, as well as blank Mighty Muggs for customization. The line was commercially dormant for a few years, but certain retailers received exclusive 'continuation' lines. Comic-Con International 2011 had an exclusive Avengers line.

In 2017, Hasbro announced the return of Star Wars, Marvel & Transformers-themed Mighty Muggs for release in 2018.

Figures

Star Wars
 Wave 1
 Boba Fett
 Chewbacca with bowcaster
 Darth Maul with red double-sided lightsaber
 Darth Vader with red lightsaber
 Han Solo with gun
 Stormtrooper with gun
 Wave 2
 C-3PO
 Luke Skywalker with blue lightsaber
 Mace Windu with purple lightsaber
 Obi-Wan Kenobi (from Revenge of the Sith) with blue lightsaber
 Wave 3
 Clone Commander Cody with gun
 Jango Fett with two guns
 Lando Calrissian with cape
 Princess Leia with gun
 Wave 4
 Emperor Palpatine with force lightning bolt
 General Grievous with blue and green lightsabers
 Luke Skywalker (in Cloud City attire from The Empire Strikes Back) with blue lightsaber
 Yoda with green lightsaber
 Wave 5
 Anakin Skywalker (from The Clone Wars) with blue lightsaber
 Asajj Ventress with two red lightsabers
 Captain Rex with two guns
 Count Dooku with red lightsaber and force lightning bolt
 Wave 6
 Helmetless Darth Vader with red lightsaber
 Grand Moff Tarkin
 Han Solo (in Hoth attire from The Empire Strikes Back) with gun
 Plo Koon with blue lightsaber
 Wave 7
 Shirtless Darth Maul with red double-sided lightsaber
 Darth Revan with red lightsaber
After Wave 7, the line was discontinued, but two waves were made available through online exclusive waves:
 Wave 8
 Qui-Gon Jinn with green lightsaber
 Royal Guard with staff
 Wampa with bone and detachable arm
 Wicket with spear
 Wave 9
 Gamorrean Guard with axe
 Luke Skywalker (in Hoth attire from Episode V) with blue lightsaber
 Obi-Wan Kenobi (from Episode IV) with blue lightsaber
 Scout Trooper with gun
 Exclusive
 Commander Gree with gun (Comic Con 2008)
 Admiral Ackbar (Previews Exclusive 2008)
 Shadow Trooper with gun (Previews Exclusive 2008)
 Biggs Darklighter (Target - March 2009)
 Bossk (Target - March 2009)
 Shock Trooper (Target - March 2009)
 Snow Trooper (Target - March 2009)
 Teebo (Target - March 2009)
 Mini Muggs
 Original Trilogy 3 Pack: Darth Vader, Yoda & Stormtrooper (Target - Oct 2010)
 Bounty Hunter 3 Pack: Bossk, Boba Fett & IG-88 (Target - Oct 2010)
 Clone Wars 3 Pack: Cad Bane, General Grievous & Captain Rex (Target - Oct 2010)

Marvel Universe
 Wave 1
 Iron Man
 Spider-Man
 Venom
 Wolverine
 Wave 2
 Captain America with shield
 Dr. Doom
 Hulk
 Thing
 Wave 3
 Doc Ock
 Ghost Rider
 Spider-Man (in black costume)
 Thor with Mjolnir
 Wave 4
 Galactus
 Human Torch
 Silver Surfer with surfboard
 Wave 5
 Ultimate Captain America with shield
 Iron Man (Mark I armor)
 Skrull
 Vision with cape
 Wave 6 (not available through "big-box" retail outlets)
 Cyclops
 Logan with cowboy hat
 Sabretooth
 Phoenix
 Iron Man 2 Movie Wave
 Iron Man Mark VI
 War Machine
 Exclusive
 Movie Iron Man (Comic Con 2008)
 Peter Parker with Spider-sense face (Comic Con 2008)
 Red Skull (Previews Exclusive 2008)
 Thanos (Previews Exclusive 2008)
 Jigsaw with gun (Toys 'R' Us - December 2008)
 Punisher with gun (Toys 'R' Us - December 2008)
 Wolverine with retractable claws (Comic Con 2009)
 Iron Man Mark VI with Flip up visor (Comic Con 2010)
 Spider-Man with removable cloth mask (Comic Con 2011)
 Mini Muggs
 Avengers 5-pack: Captain America, Thor, Iron Man, Hulk, & Giant Man (traditional Mighty Muggs size) (Comic Con 2011)
 Maximum Carnage 5-pack: Spider-Man, Carnage, Venom, J. Jonah Jameson, & Demogoblin (New York Comic Con 2011)
 Avengers 2-Packs
 Captain America vs Red Skull
 Hulk vs Abomination
 Thor vs Loki
 Iron Man (Silver Centurion Armor) vs Iron Monger
 The Avengers Movie Wave
 Captain America
 Iron Man
 Hulk
 Thor
 Hawkeye
 Nick Fury
 Micro Muggs
 Iron Man 3 Blind Box
 Wave 1
 Mark XLII Armor
 Mark V Armor
 Tony Stark
 Mark IV (no mask)
 Mark XV Armor "Sneaky"
 Mark XVI Armor "Nightclub"
 Mark XVII Armor "Heartbreaker"
 Mark XXXVII Armor "Hammerhead"
 Mark XXXIX Armor "Gemini"
 Mark XLI Armor "Bones"
 War Machine Mark II
 Hammer Drone
 Wave 2
 Mark I Armor
 Mark VII Armor
 Mark XXV Armor "Striker"
 Mark XXXIII Armor "Silver Centurion"
 Mark XXXV Armor "Red Snapper"
 Iron Patriot
 Mark VI Armor Hologram
 Iron Monger
 Ivan Vanko
 Bleeding Edge Armor
 Hulkbuster Armor
 The Avengers 4-pack
 Captain America
 Hulk
 Iron Man
 Thor
 Avengers Assemble Blind Box
 Wave 1
 Nick Fury
 Captain America
 Hawkeye
 Hulk
 Thor
 Iron Man
 Kang
 Ultron
 Red Skull
 Loki
 World War II Captain America
 M.O.D.O.K

Indiana Jones
 Wave 1
 Cairo Swordsman with scimitar
 Indiana Jones with dark brown hat and whip
 Mola Ram with fiery heart
 Wave 2
 Dr. Henry Jones
 Monkey Man with monkey
 Mutt Williams with sword
 Exclusive
 Fertility Idol (Comic Con 2008)
 Sallah (Entertainment Earth 2008)
 Short Round (Entertainment Earth 2008)

Un-produced figures for the Indiana Jones line include Spalko (Crystal Skull), Saitpo & Toht (Raiders of the Lost Ark), and three versions of Indiana Jones: College Professor, White Tuxedo (Temple of Doom), and Young Boy Scout (The Last Crusade).

G.I. Joe
 Wave 1
 Cobra Commander with gun and cape
 Duke with gun
 Snake Eyes with gun and sword
 Storm Shadow with sword
 Wave 2
 Baroness with gun
 Destro with gun
 Wave 3 (Wave Cancelled)
 Serpentor with gun and cape
 Cobra Trooper with gun
 Shipwreck with parrot
 Zartan with gun

Transformers Universe

 Wave 1
 Bumblebee
 Megatron with arm cannon
 Optimus Prime with cannon
 Soundwave with gun
 Wave 2
 Grimlock with sword
 Starscream with removable wings
 Wave 3 (January 2010)
 Bumblebee (Movie version)
 Jazz with gun and removable wings
 Optimus Prime (Movie version)
 Shockwave with gun
Exclusives
 Optimus Prime with cannon (glossy repaint) - San Diego Comic-Con International 2009 Exclusive
Prowl with gun and removable wings - San Diego Comic-Con International 2010 Exclusive
Unproduced
Ironhide

2018
January, Star Wars & Marvel (These switch between three different facial expressions when you press down on the heads.)
 Darth Vader
 Princess Leia Organa
 Luke Skywalker
 Rey
 Kylo Ren
 Black Widow
 Spider-Man
 Groot
 Star-Lord
 Captain America
 Hulk

References

External links
Most Active Mighty Muggs Forum
Custom Mighty Muggs
Mighty Muggs on Hasbro.com
Free Mighty Muggs iOS Checklist Application
Mighty Muggs Visual Guide

Hasbro products